Hu Chuanzhi (December 1929 – 29 September 2018) was a Chinese shipbuilding executive and politician. He served as CEO of the China State Shipbuilding Corporation, the state-owned shipbuilding conglomerate, and as Vice Chairman of the Shanghai Municipal People's Congress.

Biography 
Hu Chuanzhi was born in December 1929 in Wuchang, Hubei, China. He joined the Communist Party of China in March 1954. 

He spent most of his career in the shipbuilding industry, first as an engineer at Zhonghua Shipyard in Shanghai, where he helped design China's first generation of guided-missile destroyers. He then became deputy head and then head of Jiangnan Shipyard, where he oversaw the construction of the Yuan Wang 1 and Yuan Wang 2 tracking ships. He was later promoted to CEO of the China State Shipbuilding Corporation.

Hu was a member of the 7th National People's Congress, and a delegate to the 13th National Congress of the Communist Party of China. He served two terms as Vice Chairman of the 9th and 10th Shanghai Municipal People's Congress (minister-level).

On 29 September 2018, Hu died at Huadong Hospital in Shanghai, aged 88.

References 

1929 births
2018 deaths
Chinese chief executives
Businesspeople from Wuhan
Politicians from Wuhan
Engineers from Hubei
Delegates to the 7th National People's Congress
Political office-holders in Shanghai
Chinese shipbuilders